Mecyclothorax rufipennis is a species of ground beetle in the subfamily Psydrinae. It was described by Liebherr in 2008.

References

rufipennis
Beetles described in 2008